Alexander Charles Robert "Alastair" Vane-Tempest-Stewart, 9th Marquess of Londonderry (7 September 1937 – 20 June 2012) was a British nobleman.

Biography
The son of Robin Vane-Tempest-Stewart, 8th Marquess of Londonderry (1902–1955) and his wife, the former Romaine Combe (died 1951), Alexander Charles Robert Vane-Tempest-Stewart was known as "Alastair". He was educated at Ludgrove School. When the 8th Marquess died in 1955, Alastair became the 9th Marquess at age 18. He renovated the family estate, Wynyard Park, County Durham, which Nikolaus Pevsner described as "the most splendid 19th-century mansion house in the county". Wynyard was sold by Lord Londonderry in 1987 and is now owned by the property developer Sir John Hall.

Lord Londonderry was an accomplished pianist, and a self-taught linguist. He was an authority on Franz Liszt, the Hungarian composer and virtuoso, and could read French, German, and Italian.

His first wife, whom he married in 1958, was Nicolette Elaine Katherine, daughter of Michael Harrison, a stockbroker, and his Latvian-born wife. Nicolette, Lady Londonderry, gave birth to two daughters: Lady Sophia (b. 23 February 1959) and Lady Cosima (b. 25 December 1961, who married Lord John Robert Somerset, third son of David Somerset, 11th Duke of Beaufort).

She also gave birth to a son, Tristan, who was once but is no longer styled Viscount Castlereagh, as Lord Londonderry later proved that Tristan was not his biological child, but that of the singer Georgie Fame. The Londonderrys divorced in 1971. Lady Cosima would later claim that her biological father was actually Robin Douglas-Home, nephew of Sir Alec Douglas-Home, the former Prime Minister. Nicolette married Georgie Fame in 1972; they later had another son, James. She committed suicide in 1993.

Lord Londonderry's second wife was Doreen Patricia Wells, former principal dancer at the Royal Ballet, whom he married in 1972; they divorced in 1989. They had two sons, Frederick Aubrey Vane-Tempest-Stewart (born 6 September 1972), and Lord Reginald Alexander Vane-Tempest-Stewart (b. 1977), who is married to Chloë Belinda Guinness (born 29 April 1976); the couple have a son and two daughters.

Death
The 9th Marquess of Londonderry died on 20 June 2012, aged 74. His elder son, Frederick Vane-Tempest-Stewart, Viscount Castlereagh, succeeded to his titles as the 10th Marquess.

Ancestry

References

External links

Alistair Vane-Tempest-Stewart, 9th Marquess of Londonderry
 http://www.scotsman.com/news/obituaries/obituary-alexander-charles-robert-vane-tempest-stewart-the-9th-marquess-of-londonderry-aristocrat-and-landowner-1-2388507
 http://www.express.co.uk/expressyourself/328299/9th-Marquess-of-Londonderry-Aristocrat-September-7-1937-Died-June-20-2012-Aged-74.
ThePeerage.com
Wynyard Hall official site

1937 births
2012 deaths
Alistair
Place of birth missing
Place of death missing
People from the Borough of Stockton-on-Tees
9
People educated at Ludgrove School
Londonderry